Xinmin may refer to:

China
Xinmin, Liaoning, county-level city of Shenyang
Xinmin Evening News, newspaper published in Shanghai
Xinmin Weekly, newsmagazine published in Shanghai
Xinmin Station, current Lile Station, station of Guangzhou-Zhuhai Intercity Mass Rapid Transit

Singapore
Xinmin Secondary School, in Hougang, Singapore